Andrena stragulata is a Palearctic species of mining bee.

References

External links
Images representing Andrena stragulata 

Hymenoptera of Europe
stragulata
Insects described in 1806